Özer Hurmacı (born 20 November 1986) is a Turkish former professional footballer who played a winger or attacking midfielder. He represented the Turkey national team in varied age levels, including his two caps for senior level in 2010.

Club career

Ankaraspor
Born in Kassel, Hurmacı started off his footballing career in his home town with amateur side Hermania Kassel. He then later had stints with Turkgucu Kassel and Baunatal. At the age of 17, he was scouted by Ankaraspor officials and played in the youth team in the 2004–05 season. His performances later earned him three-and-a-half-year deal in January.

The following season Hurmacı was loaned out to Keçiörengücü for the 2005–06 campaign. He played 29 games for the club, having a goal tally of three. He broke through the ranks in the 2007–08 season, signing an extension with the club until 2011.

In 2009, he went through an injury that has ruled him out of play for approximately a month, he had broken a bone in his foot during a match against city rivals Gençlerbirliği.

Fenerbahçe
On 15 June 2009, Hurmacı was transferred to Fenerbahçe for €6.2 million and in exchange Fenerbahçe sent İlhan Parlak and Özgür Çek. On 23 December 2009, he scored his first two goals for Fenerbahçe against Altay. On 17 October 2011, he scored a goal against Mersin İdman Yurdu from 48 metres.

Kasımpaşa
On 25 August 2012, Hurmacı joined Kasımpaşa.

On 12 March 2022, he announced his retirement out of professional football via his social media account.

International career
Holding both Turkish and German citizenship, Hurmacı was free for both nations to be selected into their youth national teams. Eventually he was called up twice to the U20 Turkish National Team squad in 2005. Subsequently, U21 manager Hami Mandıralı promoted Özer to the U21 squad where he has been capped six times.

Style of play
Hurmacı was notable for his dribbling, and vision on the pitch. Quick on the ball and playable to both wings on the pitch.

Honours
Fenerbahçe
Süper Lig: 2010–11
Turkish Super Cup: 2009
Turkish Cup: 2011–12

References

External links

 
 
 
 

1986 births
Living people
German people of Turkish descent
Turkish footballers
German footballers
Association football wingers
Association football midfielders
Turkey international footballers
Turkey under-21 international footballers
Turkey youth international footballers
Süper Lig players
Ankaraspor footballers
Ankara Keçiörengücü S.K. footballers
Fenerbahçe S.K. footballers
Kasımpaşa S.K. footballers
Trabzonspor footballers
Akhisarspor footballers
Büyükşehir Belediye Erzurumspor footballers
Sivasspor footballers
Bursaspor footballers
German expatriate footballers